"Stereotypes" is a song by English alternative rock band Blur and is the opening track to their fourth studio album, The Great Escape (1995). It was released on 12 February 1996 as the third single from that album, charting at number seven on the UK Singles Chart. It also became a minor hit in Australia, peaking at number 95 on the ARIA Singles Chart in June 1996. The accompanying UK B-sides—"The Man Who Left Himself", "Tame" and "Ludwig"—demonstrated a dramatic change in style for Blur, being stark and raw, foreshadowing the stylistic shift that would realize itself on their eponymous follow-up album.

Music video
The music video which was directed by Matthew Longfellow features live footage. Whereas the previous live video promo "End of a Century" was live in picture and sound, "Stereotypes" is simply live footage edited to fit the album track recording.

Track listings
All music was composed by Damon Albarn, Graham Coxon, Alex James, and Dave Rowntree. All lyrics were composed by Albarn.

UK and Australasian CD single
 "Stereotypes"
 "The Man Who Left Himself"
 "Tame"
 "Ludwig"

UK 7-inch and cassette single
 "Stereotypes" – 3:11
 "The Man Who Left Himself" – 3:21
 "Tame" – 4:47

European CD single
 "Stereotypes" – 3:09
 "The Horrors" – 3:17

Italian CD single
 "Stereotypes" – 3:09
 "The Horrors" – 3:17
 "A Song" – 1:45
 "St. Louis" – 3:12

Personnel
 Damon Albarn – lead vocals, synthesizers, organ
 Graham Coxon – electric guitar, backing vocals
 Alex James – bass guitar
 Dave Rowntree – drums

Charts

References

External links
 Lyrics

Blur (band) songs
1996 singles
1996 songs
Food Records singles
Parlophone singles
Song recordings produced by Stephen Street
Songs written by Alex James (musician)
Songs written by Damon Albarn
Songs written by Dave Rowntree
Songs written by Graham Coxon